Laurine van Riessen (born 10 August 1987) is a long track speed skater and track cyclist, who currently rides for UCI Track Team . She competed for the Netherlands at the 2010 Winter Olympics in Vancouver in the 500, 1000, and 1500 metres and won the bronze medal in the 1000 metres. In 2015, she switched to track cycling and won a bronze medal in the team sprint at the 2015 UEC European Track Championships in Grenchen, Switzerland.

Van Riessen competed for the Netherlands in track cycling at the 2016 Summer Olympics in Rio de Janeiro, Brazil. In 2017, she rode for the British team Matrix Pro Cycling. On 4 September 2018 she joined .

Major results

2015
National Track Championships
1st  500m time trial
1st  Individual sprint
1st  Keirin
US Grand Prix of Sprinting
1st 500m time trial
2nd Individual sprint
Independence Day Grand Prix
1st Keirin
1st Sprint
3rd 500m Time Trial
Grand Prix of Colorado Springs
1st Keirin
1st Sprint
1st Team Sprint (with Yesna Rijkhoff)
Vic Williams Memorial Grand Prix
1st 500m time trial
2nd Individual sprint
2nd Keirin, Internationale Radsport Meeting
3rd European Track Championships (Team sprint)

2016
Milton International Challenge
1st Keirin
1st Sprint
1st 500m Time Trial
National Track Championships
1st  Individual sprint
3rd Keirin
Apeldoorn Track Championships
2nd Team sprint
3rd Individual sprint
3rd Grenchen Track Cycling Challenge (Individual sprint)
3rd Sprint, Dudenhofen
3rd Sprint, Öschelbronn

2017
Belgian International Track Meeting
1st Sprint
1st Keirin
Internationaal Baan Sprint Keirin Toernooi
1st Sprint
1st Keirin
Dublin International
1st Sprint
1st Keirin
3rd Keirin, Six Days of Rotterdam
3rd Sprint, Öschelbronn

2018
1st Keirin, Worldcup Track Cycling Saint Quentin-en-Yvelines

References

External links

1987 births
Dutch female speed skaters
Speed skaters at the 2010 Winter Olympics
Speed skaters at the 2014 Winter Olympics
Olympic speed skaters of the Netherlands
Medalists at the 2010 Winter Olympics
Olympic medalists in speed skating
Olympic bronze medalists for the Netherlands
Sportspeople from Leiden
Living people
Olympic cyclists of the Netherlands
Cyclists at the 2016 Summer Olympics
Cyclists at the 2019 European Games
Cyclists at the 2020 Summer Olympics
European Games competitors for the Netherlands
Cyclists from South Holland
21st-century Dutch women